SS Frederick E. Williamson was a Liberty ship built in the United States during World War II. She was named after Frederick E. Williamson.

Construction
Frederick E. Williamson was laid down on 18 November 1944, under a Maritime Commission (MARCOM) contract, MC hull 2334, by J.A. Jones Construction, Panama City, Florida; sponsored by Mrs. Ruby Harris, the owner of the Cove Hotel, Panama City, she was launched on 23 December 1944.

History
She was allocated to International Freigting Corp., on 12 January 1945. On 5 June 1946, she was laid up in the Hudson River Reserve Fleet, Jones Point, New York. On 29 January 1947, while being withdrawn from the fleet to be delivered to Moore-McCormack Lines, Inc., she was damaged. With estimates of repairs at $70,000 she was returned to the Hudson River Reserve Fleet. After repairs she was charted to Waterman Steamship Corp., 30 August 1947. She was laid up in the James River Reserve Fleet, Lee Hall, Virginia, 6 October 1947. On 20 October 1951, she was charted to American President Lines. She was laid up in the National Defense Reserve Fleet, Olympia, Washington, 2 October 1953. On 8 April 1970, she was transferred to the US Navy for use as a Ammo Disposal Ship.

References

Bibliography

 
 
 
 
 

 

Liberty ships
Ships built in Panama City, Florida
1944 ships
James River Reserve Fleet
Hudson River Reserve Fleet
Olympia Reserve Fleet